Carlos García Romero (25 June 1940 – 30 December 2013), better known by his stage name Tito Mora, was a Spanish pop singer.

Born in Madrid, he began his career as a member of Los Brujos, one of Spain's first pop music groups, and recorded his final album in 1996.

Tito Mora died from a long pulmonary illness on 30 December 2013, aged 72, at a hospital in Madrid.

References

1940 births
2013 deaths
Singers from Madrid
Spanish pop singers
Deaths from respiratory failure
20th-century Spanish musicians
20th-century Spanish male singers
20th-century Spanish singers